The Virginia Slims of Arizona is a defunct WTA Tour affiliated tennis tournament played from 1986 to 1991. It was held in Phoenix, Arizona in the United States from 1986 to 1989 and in Scottsdale, Arizona from 1990 to 1991. The tournament was played on outdoor hard courts.

Results

Singles

Doubles

See also
 Thunderbird Classic

References
 WTA Results Archive

 
Defunct tennis tournaments in the United States
Hard court tennis tournaments
Arizona
WTA Tour
Women's sports in Arizona